Abrotanella forsteroides is a member of the daisy family and is an endemic species of Tasmania, Australia.

References

Flora of Tasmania
forsteroides
Taxa named by George Bentham